The girls' 100 metres event at the 2010 Youth Olympic Games was held on 18–21 August 2010 in Bishan Stadium.

Schedule

Results

Heats

Finals

Final E
wind: –0.2 m/s

Final D
wind: –0.8 m/s

Final C
wind: –0.3 m/s

Final B
wind: –0.4 m/s

Final A
wind: +0.2 m/s

External links
 iaaf.org - Women's 100m
 

Athletics at the 2010 Summer Youth Olympics
2010